Katherine Glessner (born March 11, 1986) is an American rower. She competed in the 2009 and 2010 World Rowing Championships in the Women's coxed eight event and won gold medals in each event. In 2013 she was inducted into the Northeastern Athletics Hall of Fame, and the following year joined the women's Northeastern University rowing team as an assistant coach.

References

External links
 

1986 births
Living people
American female rowers
World Rowing Championships medalists for the United States
Northeastern University alumni
21st-century American women